Koritnice is a village east of Knežak in the Municipality of Ilirska Bistrica in the Inner Carniola region of Slovenia.

Mass grave
Koritnice is the site of a mass grave from the Second World War. Based on descriptions by spelunkers and reports from local people, it contains the remains of German soldiers thrown into the shaft during the war.

Churches
There are two churches in the settlement, both belonging to the Parish of Knežak. The church in the village is dedicated to Saint Anthony the Hermit and a church on a hill north of the settlement is dedicated to Saint Jerome.

References

External links 
 Koritnice on Geopedia

Populated places in the Municipality of Ilirska Bistrica